2021 Filmfare OTT Awards, the second edition of awards show was held on 9 December 2021 in Mumbai. These awards honour artistic and technical excellence in original programming on over-the-top streaming media in Hindi-language. Web original shows or films released across OTT platforms between 1 August 2020 and 31 July 2021 were eligible for Awards. Nominations were announced by Filmfare on 2 December 2021.

Winners and nominees

Popular awards

Critics' Choice Awards

Technical awards

See also
 Filmfare Awards
 67th Filmfare Awards

References

External links 
 
 Nominees for the My Glamm Filmfare OTT Awards 2021
 Winners Of My Glamm Filmfare OTT Awards 2021

Award ceremonies in India
OTT, 2021
Filmfare OTT